Biz2Credit is an online financing platform for small businesses. The company provides direct funding to small businesses across the United States. The company is known for its financing products, educational resources for business such as the BizAnalyzer, and research that it publishes periodically, including the Small Business Lending Index, and its subsidiary SaaS business lending platform Biz2X.

The company uses big data analytics, engineering, and predictive modeling to help optimize cash flow for small businesses.

History 
Biz2Credit was founded in 2007 by Ramit Arora and Rohit Arora as an online financial platform in the alternative lending industry. While the company began initially as a provider of Marketplace lending for businesses, in 2013 the company changed its approach and to offer financing directly to its clients.

The company's investors include Nexus Venture Partners  and Tata Capital. In 2014, the company received a $250 million commitment from direct lending investment to expand its small business financing facility.

In 2019 Biz2Credit secured $50 million in Series B funding.

The company launched its global SaaS (software-as-a-service) platform – Biz2X in 2019. Biz2Credit changed in the same year.

Biz2Credit launched the CPA portal in partnership with CPA.com. The platforms also launched PPP Loan Forgiveness Tool in July 2020.

In response to the COVID-19 pandemic, the company launched an online forum virtual event series with members of Congress in 2020. The company also launched pppforgivenesstool.com to help small business owners secure loan forgiveness on their PPP Loans and ensure they could maintain adequate cash flow.

In December 2020, Biz2Credit announced taking pre-applications for the new round of the PPP.

As of July 2022, the company has facilitated more than $8 billion in loans and financings to small business owners. Biz2Credit is a primary participant in the OCC Project REACh initiative to help small businesses secure access to capital. The company is a member Innovative Lending Platform Association (ILPA), a trade organization representing online lending and service companies that serve small businesses.

Services
Biz2Credit offers online business financing services through three financial products: term loans, working capital financing, and commercial real estate loans. Financing rates are based on the borrower's financial metrics and their online financing applications completed on Biz2Credit.com. The company does not offer other banking services beyond loans and financing.

Biz2Credit also provides small businesses with software tools that can be used to help their companies improve financial performance, such as the BizAnalyzer Virtual CFO platform they have developed.

Operations
Biz2Credit is headquartered in New York City, NY. Biz2Credit uses Amazon Web Services machine learning to automate the loan process by extracting text and data from documents.

The company frequently publishes proprietary research that is used by journalists, data scientists and industry trade groups to assess the financial performance of small businesses. Periodic research reports include the Annual Women-Owned Business Study, Latino-Owned Business Study, Top 25 Small Business Cities Report and Small Business Industries Report.

Clients 
2016, Tata Capital
2018, HSBC Bank 
2018, Tally Solutions
2019, Andromeda

Partners
CPA.com & the AICPA
Paychex
The Hartford Insurance
America's Women Business Centers
Nationwide Insurance

Awards
2022, The LIT Commercial Awards: Platinum Award for the Commercial & Marketing - Financial Services category
2022, The American Business Awards (2 Categories: Fastest Growing Tech Company & Social Video)
2022 The Muse Creative Awards (2 Categories: Advertising Campaign & TV Ad)
Best Places to Work in New York
Best Places to Work in Fintech (American Banker)
2021 Finovate Award: Excellence in Pandemic Response
Biz2X – IBS Intelligence (IBSi) Global Fintech Innovation Award
Best Small Business Loans Provider by CNBC Money in December 2021
Top 100 Best Midsize Companies to Work in NYC in 2021

References 

Financial services companies based in New York City